Noh Young-min (born 25 November 1957) is a South Korean politician previously served as the Chief of Staff to the President Moon Jae-in and his first ambassador to China. He is a three-term parliamentarian of the ruling party, Democratic Party of Korea, and reportedly one of the closest confidants of Moon.

Noh was admitted to Yonsei University to study business management in 1976. In 1977 he was imprisoned for two years for being involved in a protest against authoritarian regime of Park Chung-hee and in 1978 further sentenced for continuing related endeavors while in jail. In 1979 he was pardoned and released from jail. However, he was placed on police's wanted list and expelled from the university in the following year due to his involvement in Gwangju Uprising. Before being re-admitted to the university, he worked as electric engineer and labour right activist. Noh graduated from the university in 1990.

While serving as a member of National Assembly, Noh took various high-level roles in his party and its preceding parties. He was also the chief of staff to Moon's first presidential campaign in 2012. After announcing that he won't run for re-election in 2016 general election, he helped Do Jong-hwan's campaign for his constituency's seat in parliament and later Moon's presidential campaign in 2017.

Electoral history

References 

Living people
Ambassadors of South Korea to China
Yonsei University alumni
People from Cheongju
1957 births
Members of the National Assembly (South Korea)
Minjoo Party of Korea politicians
Uri Party politicians
Chiefs of Staff to the President of South Korea